Formerly the Indiana Web Academy, the Indiana E-Learning Academy is a program of the Indiana Department of Education.  The stated mission of the Indiana E-Learning Academy is to empower the students and educators in the state of Indiana to integrate technology and the Internet with education.

Related Sites
 Indiana E-Learning Academy
 A practitioner's perspective in post learning via e-learning
 Post learning and educational materials in practice

Education in Indiana